ICMS may refer to:
Immigration Case Management Services
International College of Management, Sydney
Institute of Computer and Management Sciences
International Centre for Mathematical Sciences
Integrated Criminal Case Filing And Management System